The Space Telescope Science Data Analysis System (STSDAS) is an IRAF-based suite of astronomical software for reducing and analyzing astronomical data.  It contains general purpose tools and packages for processing data from the Hubble Space Telescope. STSDAS is produced by Space Telescope Science Institute (STScI).  The STSDAS software is in the public domain and the source code is available.

See also 

Space flight simulation game
List of space flight simulation games
Planetarium software
List of observatory software

References

External links
 STSDAS Home Page

Free astronomy software
Hubble Space Telescope